Pleurotomella gibbera is a species of sea snail, a marine gastropod mollusk in the family Raphitomidae.

Description
The length of the shell attains 5 mm.

Distribution
This marine species occurs off Madeira and also in the central and western Mediterranean Sea.

References

 Bouchet, P.; Warén, A. (1980). Revision of the North-East Atlantic bathyal and abyssal Turridae (Mollusca: Gastropoda). Journal of Molluscan Studies. Suppl. 8: 1-119 
  Gofas, S.; Le Renard, J.; Bouchet, P. (2001). Mollusca. in: Costello, M.J. et al. (eds), European Register of Marine Species: a check-list of the marine species in Europe and a bibliography of guides to their identification. Patrimoines Naturels. 50: 180-213

External links
 Gofas, S.; Luque, Á. A.; Templado, J.; Salas, C. (2017). A national checklist of marine Mollusca in Spanish waters. Scientia Marina. 81(2) : 241-254, and supplementary online material
 
  Serge GOFAS, Ángel A. LUQUE, Joan Daniel OLIVER,José TEMPLADO & Alberto SERRA (2021) - The Mollusca of Galicia Bank (NE Atlantic Ocean); European Journal of Taxonomy 785: 1–114
 Gastropods.com: Pleurotomella gibbera

gibbera
Gastropods described in 1980